Ngati is a 1987 New Zealand feature film directed by Barry Barclay, written by Tama Poata and produced by John O'Shea.

Production
Ngati is of historical and cultural significance in New Zealand as it is the first feature film written and directed by Māori. Producer John O'Shea, an icon in New Zealand's film industry, was the  founder of independent film company Pacific Films. The film is set in 1948 in a small town on the east coast of New Zealand during the impending closure of a freezing works and the threat of unemployment for the local community. Ngati was screened as part of Cannes' Critics Week.

Synopsis
Set in and around the fictional town of Kapua in 1948, Ngati is the story of a Māori community. The film comprises three narrative threads: a boy, Ropata, is dying of leukaemia; the return of a young Australian doctor, Greg, and his discovery that he has Māori heritage; and the fight to keep the local freezing works open. Unique in tone and quietly powerful in its storytelling, Ngati was Barry Barclay's first dramatic feature and the first feature to be written and directed by Māori. Ngati screened in Critics' Week at Cannes.

Cast
The film features veteran stage and screen actor Wi Kuki Kaa in the lead role of 'Iwi'.

Awards
 Best Film, Taormina Film Festival, Italy
 Best Film, Best Original Screenplay, Best Male Actor (Wi Kuki Kaa): 1988 New Zealand Listener Film & Television Awards

References

External links

Watch Ngati movie clip at NZ On Screen
Official NZ Government Film website
Interview with director Barry Barclay on Youtube

New Zealand drama films
Films set in New Zealand
1987 drama films
1980s New Zealand films
Māori-language films
Films set in 1948
1987 films
Films about Māori people